Robert Louis "Bob" Arnzen (born November 3, 1947) is a retired American basketball and baseball player.

Born in Covington, Kentucky, Arnzen graduated from St. Xavier High School in Cincinnati, Ohio in 1965. He then played collegiately for the University of Notre Dame.

Arnzen was selected by the Detroit Pistons in the 8th round (93rd pick overall) of the 1969 NBA draft.  He played for the New York Nets (1969–70), and Indiana Pacers (1972–74) in the ABA for 56 games (winning the 1972–73 ABA Championship) and for the Cincinnati Royals (1970–71) in the NBA for 55 games.

Arnzen additionally played Minor League Baseball for the Gulf Coast Expos (1969), West Palm Beach Expos (1969–71), Winnipeg Whips (1971), Québec Carnavals (1972), and Peninsula Whips (1972).

He is the son of Stan Arnzen (1914–1977), who played in the National Basketball League during the 1930s.

References

External links 

1947 births
Living people
American men's basketball players
Baseball players from Kentucky
Basketball players from Kentucky
American expatriate baseball players in Canada
Cincinnati Royals players
Detroit Pistons draft picks
Gulf Coast Expos players
Indiana Pacers players
New York Nets players
Notre Dame Fighting Irish men's basketball players
Peninsula Whips players
Québec Carnavals players
Sportspeople from Covington, Kentucky
St. Xavier High School (Ohio) alumni
West Palm Beach Expos players
Winnipeg Whips players
Small forwards